Chaalbaaz may refer to:

 ChaalBaaz, a 1989 Bollywood film directed by Pankaj Parashar
 Chaalbaaz (1958 film)